Tiasa Adhya (born ) is an Indian conservationist and wildlife biologist. She monitors fishing cats and has received the Nari Shakti Puraskar.

Career
Tiasa Adhya studied zoology at the University of Calcutta and did research at the University of Trans-Disciplinary Health Sciences and Technology. Adhya works for the International Union for Conservation of Nature (IUCN). As part of the Species Survival Commission, she monitors fishing cats in West Bengal. She also co-founded the Fishing Cat Project.

Adhya has received the Nari Shakti Puraskar and the 2022 Future For Nature award in recognition of her achievements.

References

1980s births
Living people
Year of birth uncertain
Indian women biologists
Indian conservationists
University of Calcutta alumni
Nari Shakti Puraskar winners